Jerry Mark Golsteyn (born August 6, 1954) is a former American football player. Golsteyn played college football as quarterback at Northern Illinois University and was selected in the 12th round of the 1976 NFL Draft by the New York Giants. He played in eight National Football League (NFL) seasons, from 1977 to 1984 for five different teams, the Giants, the Baltimore Colts, the Detroit Lions, the Tampa Bay Buccaneers, and the Los Angeles Raiders. Golsteyn  also played a brief stint for the Orlando Americans in the American Football Association in 1981, becoming one of the few NFL-caliber players to play in that league. The fact that Golsteyn was a star in the league was occasionally used as a joke regarding the AFA's inability to sign marquee talent. He then played for the Orlando Renegades of the United States Football League (USFL) in 1985.

References

External links
 

1954 births
Living people
American football quarterbacks
Baltimore Colts players
Detroit Lions players
Los Angeles Raiders players
New York Giants players
Northern Illinois Huskies football players
Tampa Bay Buccaneers players
Washington Federals/Orlando Renegades players
People from West Allis, Wisconsin
Players of American football from Wisconsin